Patty Prather Thum (October 1, 1853 – September 28, 1926) was an American artist from Louisville, Kentucky known for her landscapes, paintings of roses, and book illustrations. She studied art at Vassar College and the Art Students League of New York and maintained a portrait and landscape studio in Louisville for 35 years. She taught art, illustrated books and magazines, was an inventor, served as the president of the Louisville Art League, member of the Louisville Women's Club, and was the art critic for the Louisville Herald until 1925.

Early life and education
Patty Prather Thum, daughter of prominent Louisville doctor Mandeville Thum and Louisiana (Miller) Thum, was born in Louisville, Kentucky on October 1, 1853. She was first tutored in drawing by her mother. As a child, Thum visited her grandparents at their rural home and developed a "love of nature".  Thum studied art at Vassar College with Henry Van Ingen, becoming one of the first Kentucky graduates. Thum studied with William Merritt Chase, Henry Mobray, and Lemuel Wiles at the Art Students League of New York.  At the Student's Guild of the Brooklyn Art Association she studied under Thomas Eakins.  In the mid-1870s, Thum moved back to Louisville and began a career as a painter.

Career

Thum had an art studio at the Francis Building in Louisville for over 35 years. She is most well known for her landscape painting, mostly of flowers and Kentucky scenes, but also painted still-lifes and portraits. She also contributed to art magazines and newspapers. 
She painted private gardens in Jefferson and Oldham Counties with native trees being a focus of her work.
Thum was a member of several art organizations, including the Louisville Art Association, the Art Association of Indianapolis, the American Federation of Art, and the Arts Club. 
Thum received an honorable mention for book illustration of "Robbie and Annie: A Child's Story" at the 1893 World's Columbian Exposition in Chicago.  Thum also served as art director of the 1921 Kentucky State Fair.

Personal life and death
After an illness of several months, Thum died at her home in Louisville at the age of seventy-two on September 28, 1926. She was buried at Louisville's Cave Hill Cemetery on September 30, 1926.

Exhibitions
 Southern Exposition, Louisville, 1883
 1893 World's Columbian Exposition, Chicago, 1893
 New York State Fair, Albany, 1898
 Saint Louis Exposition, St. Louis, 1904
 Paintings by Patty Thum, Indianapolis Museum of Art, 1909
Posthumous
 Kentucky Expatriates, Owensboro KY, 1984
 Kentucky Women Artists: 1850-2000, Owensboro Museum of Fine Arts and Western Kentucky University, Bowling Green, 2001
 Patty Thum, Howard Steamboat Museum, Jeffersonville IN, 2009

Gallery

References

Artists from Louisville, Kentucky
American women illustrators
American illustrators
Landscape artists
1853 births
1926 deaths
American women painters
Vassar College alumni
Painters from Kentucky
19th-century American painters
20th-century American painters
19th-century American women artists
20th-century American women artists
Kentucky women artists
Burials at Cave Hill Cemetery